Roya Mirelmi is an Iranian theater, cinema and television actress. She graduated from the Faculty of Fine Arts of Tehran University undergraduate design scene.

Filmography 
 Bidari
Khab-zadeha (2013)
 Agha Yousef(2011)
 sobhe Roze haftom (2009)
 baradar

Tv Film 
 Vojdane Ashofte (2009)
 assre Paeizi (2013)

TV series
 Bachelors Season 2-3 IRIB TV3 (2017 - 2018)
 Bachelors Season 1 IRIB TV3 (2016)
 shamdoni IRIB TV3 (2014)
 zamane IRIB TV3 (2011)
 heyrani

References

 roya mirelmi biography

External links
Roya Mirelmi In instagram
Iranian actress joins campaign to free critically ill human rights campaigner detained for 16 years, The Independent
biography roya Mirelmi actor
biography roya mirelmi to lfilm 
Roya Mirelmi to IRAN TV Cinema Wiki

Living people
People from Qazvin
People from Tehran
Iranian film actresses
Iranian stage actresses
Iranian television actresses
University of Tehran alumni
1978 births